Dolynske is a village in Melitopol Raion, Zaporizhia Oblast, Ukraine, some 20 km west of Melitopol. It was originally a Hutterite village and until 1945 was known as Johannesruh or Johannesruhe.

The village was founded in 1852/3 by 17 Hutterites families from Hutterthal, some 4 km south of the new village. It was named after Johann Cornies, who had helped the Hutterites to relocate from Radichev. In 1857 some 35 Hutterite families under the leadership of Georg Waldner (1794–1857) left Johannesruh and moved to Hutterdorf, where they had purchased 1,500 desiatinas of land to reestablish communal living. In 1877 the German inhabitants of Johannesruh migrated to the United States.

See also
 Kyrpychne, Melitopol Raion

References 

German communities in Ukraine
Hutterites in Ukraine
Hutterite communities in Europe
1852 establishments in the Russian Empire

Villages in Melitopol Raion